James Walker (born August 18, 1954) is a marathon runner. Walker, who gained Guam citizenship through residency, competed for Guam at the 1988 Summer Olympics in Seoul, Korea in the marathon, finishing 90th at 2:56:32.

Walker is a graduate of the University of Richmond, class of 1976. Though he didn't run competitively in college, Walker competed internationally three years after the 1988 Games and kept running recreationally for decades, including in multiple Boston Marathons. At age 60, he ran the 2014 Boston Marathon.

Achievements

References

James Walker's profile at Sports Reference.com

External links
 

1954 births
Living people
Athletes (track and field) at the 1988 Summer Olympics
Olympic track and field athletes of Guam
Guamanian male long-distance runners
Guamanian male marathon runners